Hermann Glaser (28 August 1928 – 18 June 2018) was a politically engaged cultural historian and commentator.

Life
Hermann Glaser was born in Nuremberg, and though he became a national figure, his Middle Franconian provenance was always an important part of his public personality.   His father was a secondary school teacher.  He studied History, Philosophy, Germanistics and Anglistics at Erlangen and, for two terms, Bristol.   It was from Erlangen that he received his doctorate in 1952.   His dissertation concerned the place of Hamlet in German Literature.   His university studies concluded, in 1953 he embarked on ten years as an enthusiastic and creative secondary school teacher, first for one year in Coburg and then, as the economic and political divisions between East and West Germany increasingly came to be matched by physical divisions, back in his birth-city of Nuremberg.  During that decade he also achieved literary success as the author of a number of school text books with a focus on German and world literature.   By 2012 his "Kleine Geschichte der modernen Weltliteratur in Problemkreisen" (loosely, "Little history of modern world literature in difficulties") had reached a remarkable nine editions.   

In 1964 Glaser switched his teaching job for a political position in Nuremberg as schools and culture consultant.  He arrived in post with his ideas well developed.   Shortly before his appointment, encouraged by Waldemar von Knoeringen, he became a member of the Social Democratic Party ("Sozialdemokratische Partei Deutschlands" / SPD), and during the 26 years that he remained in post he applied his considerable energies to promoting a "Culture of civil rights" ("Bürgerrecht Kultur") in democratic society.   In order to give the Nuremberg adolescents under his supervision more autonomy, in 1973 he co-founded a self-administering "Youth Centre", the so-called Kommunikationszentrum ("KOMM"), which inspired numerous other similar projects in other West German cities.   The initiative was not without its own risks, however.   After the infamous 1981 Mass arrest of Nuremberg Glaser stood by the 140 young people who had been besieged in the "KOMM" centreby the police and then, when they emerged, taken away and locked up, including 21 minors.   Minister-President Franz Josef Strauss was personally involved in what turned out to have been a planned power demonstration on behalf of the police and the Bavarian state government.  The incident became highly politicised:  although 78 of the 141 who had been locked up faced charges, in the end all charges were dropped.   Subsequently, those who had been arrested were awarded damages.

Glaser became chairman of the Deutscher Werkbund (loosely, "German Association of Craftsmen") and became a lecturer and honorary professor in communication sciences at the prestigious (and slightly misleading named) Technical University of Berlin.   He also taught on the specialist "Culture and Management" ("Kultur und Management") at Dresden International University.   After 1990 there were also guest professorships both in Germany and abroad.

Awards and honours (selection) 

 1985: Waldemar von Knoeringen Prize from the Georg von Vollmar Academy
 1991: Schubart Literature Prize
 1993: City of Nuremberg Prize
 2008: City of Nuremberg Citizens' Medal
 2009: Order of Merit of the Federal Republic of Germany 
 2011: Honorary membership Kulturpolitischen Gesellschaft e. V. (it was the first honorary membership ever awarded by the society)
 2016: Wolfram von Eschenbach Prize

References

Politicians from Nuremberg
German opinion journalists
Cultural historians
German radio writers
German biographers
Social Democratic Party of Germany politicians
Recipients of the Cross of the Order of Merit of the Federal Republic of Germany
1928 births
2018 deaths
German expatriates in the United Kingdom